Mitja Lotrič (born 3 September 1994) is a Slovenian footballer who plays as a midfielder for SV Allerheiligen.

Honours
Koper
Slovenian Football Cup: 2014–15
Slovenian Supercup: 2015

Celje
Slovenian PrvaLiga: 2019–20

Individual
Slovenian PrvaLiga Player of the Year: 2019–20
Slovenian PrvaLiga Team of the Year: 2019–20

References

External links
NZS profile 

1994 births
Living people
Slovenian footballers
Association football midfielders
ND Mura 05 players
FC Koper players
NK Rudar Velenje players
Pafos FC players
NK Celje players
Würzburger Kickers players
NŠ Mura players
Bnei Sakhnin F.C. players
SV Allerheiligen players
Slovenian Second League players
Slovenian PrvaLiga players
Cypriot First Division players
2. Bundesliga players

Slovenian expatriate footballers
Expatriate footballers in Cyprus
Expatriate footballers in Germany
Expatriate footballers in Israel
Expatriate footballers in Austria
Slovenian expatriate sportspeople in Cyprus
Slovenian expatriate sportspeople in Germany
Slovenian expatriate sportspeople in Israel
Slovenian expatriate sportspeople in Austria
Slovenia youth international footballers
Slovenia under-21 international footballers